Charles Eliot (November 1, 1859 – March 25, 1897) was an American landscape architect. Known for pioneering principles of regional planning, naturalistic systems approach to landscape architecture, and laying the groundwork for conservancies across the world. Instrumental in the formation of The Trustees of Reservations, the world's first land trust, playing a central role in shaping the Boston Metropolitan Park System, designing a number of public and private landscapes, and wrote prolifically on a variety of topics.

History
Eliot was born in Cambridge, Massachusetts, in 1859 to Charles W. Eliot and Ellen Derby Peabody. Charles had one brother, Samuel A. Eliot, who was a minister. His father became President of Harvard University in 1869, the same year his mother died.  He was part of the prominent Eliot family originating from Boston.

In 1878 he was admitted to Harvard College.

In 1880 Charles organized a group of college classmates who would sail to Mount Desert Island, Maine, to spend the summer. The group was named the Champlain Society, Charles Eliot being the Director. While there, studying botany, geology, meteorology, marine life, ornithology, and entomology. Charles would write his parents later that fall recommending to look between Somes's Sound and Seal Harbor if they wanted to build a house on Mount Desert Island: "Somewhere along that coast you will find a suitable spot, with beautiful views of the ocean, and hills, deep water anchorage, fine rocks and beach, and no flats." A year later his father would purchase 120 acres and build what is considered to be the first summer cottage in Northeast Harbor.

On graduation from Harvard in 1882, Eliot pursued horticultural courses at the Bussey Institute at Harvard to prepare himself for the profession of landscape architecture.

In 1883 Eliot became an apprentice for Frederick Law Olmsted and Company, where he worked on designs for Cushing Island, Maine (1883), Franklin Park (1884), the Arnold Arboretum (1885), and the Fens (1883) in Boston, and Belle Isle Park (1884) in Detroit. In 1885, on Olmsted's advice, Eliot traveled to Europe to observe natural scenery as well as the landscape designs of Capability Brown, Humphry Repton, Joseph Paxton, and Prince Hermann von Pückler-Muskau. Eliot's travel diaries provide one of the best visual assessments of European landscapes in the late 19th century.

Returning to Boston in 1886, Eliot opened his own office. His commissions included White Park (1888) in Concord, New Hampshire, Youngstown Gorge (1891), now called Mill Creek Park, in Youngstown, Ohio, and Salt Lake City's plan for a new town (1890).

In 1888 Charles married Mary Yale Pitkin from Philadelphia; this marriage produced four daughters: Ruth, Grace, Ellen, and Carola.
Mary's father was Horace Woodbridge Pitkin, a successful businessman in Tennessee, his sister Emily would marry the artist Seth Cheney. Mary Yale Pitkins' mother was Lucy Yale; Lucy's sister would marry a Mr. Beadle. Lucy's father was Reverend Cyrus Yale who graduated from Williams College in 1811 and was a minister for 40 years at the Town Hill Church in New Hartford Connecticut. The Yale, Pitkin, and Beadle Families would spend their summers at their farm called "Eaglesnest" on Town Hill Road in New Hartford Connecticut.  

On March 5, 1890, Eliot published an article entitled "Waverly Oaks" to defend a stand of virgin trees in Belmont, Massachusetts, in the process making a plea for preservation of the oaks and outlining a strategy for conserving other areas of scenic beauty in the same way that the Boston Public Library held books and the Museum of Fine Arts pictures. This article resulted in a conference held at the Massachusetts Institute of Technology in 1890 on preservation of scenic beauty, and led to the enactment of Massachusetts legislation creating The Trustees of Reservations in 1891 — the world's first organization created to "acquire, hold, protect and administer, for the benefit of the public, beautiful and historical places." Within four years, Britain's National Trust was created along these lines.

After the death of their partner Henry Sargent Codman, Olmsted's son Frederick Law Olmsted, Jr. and stepson John Charles Olmsted asked Eliot to become a full partner in their firm. In March 1893, the firm's name was changed to Olmsted, Olmsted and Eliot. Within a few months, Eliot assumed the leadership role as the elder Olmsted's health continued to fail.

In 1895, the Massachusetts legislature ordered the taking of nearly three miles of private seacoast land on what is now Revere Beach Reservation. The Metropolitan Park Commission was entrusted with the land in 1896. Eliot was chosen by the Park Commission to design Revere Beach Reservation for the best use by the public. Eliot stated in November 1896, ”We must not conceal from visitors the long sweep of the open beach which is the finest thing about the reservation.” Revere Beach would become "the first to be set aside and governed by a public body for the enjoyment of the common people."

Over the next year, some 300 structures were cleared from on and around the beach, the train tracks were moved approximately 400 yards away from the water, a boulevard was put in place to separate buildings and houses from the sand, and a bandstand and pavilions were constructed. An estimated 45,000 people showed up on opening day to enjoy the first public beach in the United States. Fittingly, the small rotary at the start of the beach's southern end is named "Eliot Circle."

Eliot died March 25, 1897, at age 37 from spinal meningitis.

Legacy
Eliot's work has left a lasting mark on greater Boston. He published conceptual plans for the esplanades along the Charles River in Boston proposed earlier by Charles Davenport and others, and as the consulting landscape architect for the Metropolitan Park Commission, he supervised the acquisition of much of the riverfront in Boston, Watertown, and Newton. He also directed the landscape work on the Cambridge esplanade for the city's park commission. The esplanade in Boston was later realized following designs by Guy Lowell (1910) and Arthur Shurcliff (1936). In 1883, he designed Longfellow Park between the Cambridge home of Henry Wadsworth Longfellow and the Charles River. Up until his death he was the partner in charge of the firm's work at Fresh Pond in Cambridge.

In addition to his practice, Eliot became a regular contributor of professional articles to Garden and Forest Magazine.

After Eliot's death, Olmsted's son and stepson reconstituted their partnership as the Olmsted Brothers, which continued for a half-century as one of the best-known landscape design firms in the United States, and went on to design thousands of parks, gardens, and landscapes in the 20th century.

Eliot's writings have been characterized as the inspiration behind the establishment of Acadia National Park on Mount Desert Island in Maine.

Monuments and memorials
Charles Eliot Memorial - Charles River Esplanade - Boston MA
Eliot Memorial Bridge - Great Blue Hill - Milton MA 
Eliot Bridge - Cambridge MA

See also
 Metropolitan Park System of Greater Boston

References

Further reading

American landscape architects
Eliot family (America)
Architects from Massachusetts
1859 births
People from Brookline, Massachusetts
Harvard College alumni
1897 deaths
Neurological disease deaths in Massachusetts
Infectious disease deaths in Massachusetts
Deaths from meningitis
Arnold Arboretum